Hugh Patrick Thompson (born 21 October 1935), known as Patrick Thompson, is a British Conservative Party politician.

Early life
Educated at Felsted School and Emmanuel College, Cambridge, Thompson was a schoolmaster, teaching physics. From 1960 to 1965, he taught at the Manchester Grammar School and from 1965 to 1983 at Gresham's School, Holt.

Parliamentary career
Thompson fought Bradford North in the February and October 1974 elections, being beaten by Labour's Ben Ford each time. In 1979 he was defeated at Barrow-in-Furness.

He was Member of Parliament for the marginal Norwich North seat, gaining it from Labour in 1983.  He held the seat until his retirement in 1997.

References
Times Guide to the House of Commons, Times Newspapers Limited, 1992 and 1997 editions
Patrick Thompson in Hansard (1)
Patrick Thompson in Hansard (2)

External links 
 

1935 births
Living people
Alumni of Emmanuel College, Cambridge
People educated at Gresham's School
Conservative Party (UK) MPs for English constituencies
Schoolteachers from Greater Manchester
Schoolteachers from Norfolk
UK MPs 1983–1987
UK MPs 1987–1992
UK MPs 1992–1997